Amaniastabarqa (also Amaniastabarqo) was a Kushite king of Meroë who ruled in the late Sixth or early Fifth centuries BC, c. 510–487 BCE.

Reign
He is the presumed successor of Karkamani, according to the sequence of the Nubian pyramids at Nuri where he was buried (no. 2). The pyramid was excavated by a Harvard University-Boston Museum of Fine Arts Expedition in 1917. As a result, many of the object belonged to him are now in Boston, including ushabtis, pottery, foundation deposits, stone objects and gold artifacts. A granite gneiss stela bearing Amaniastabarqa's cartouches, again from Nuri, is now in Boston too (acc. no. 17-2-1910B).
Other artifacts of him are in the Antiquities Museum of Khartoum, noticeably a gold pectoral.

References

6th-century BC monarchs of Kush
5th-century BC monarchs of Kush
6th-century BC rulers
5th-century BC rulers